Hoşap Castle  is a large medieval castle located in the village of Güzelsu (previously Hoşap), Gürpınar District, Van Province, Eastern Anatolia and/or Western Armenia, Turkey. It is at a distance of approximately 50 km to the city center of Van. Most of the surviving structure was built in 1643 by Sarı Süleyman Bey, chief of the Kurdish Mahmudi tribe. Hoşap or Xoşabê means "beautiful water" in Kurdish. Fortress received its name from the river of the same name.

The former town of Hoşap lay on the flat ground north of the castle rock and in the enclosed space on the opposite side of the castle from the road; the present village extends into this space. The town was defended at one corner by the castle and elsewhere by a wall, which originally started from the ends of the castle’s two cliffs. Built of mud, and toothed with the remains of mud battlements, the wall of the early Ottoman period can still be seen in stretches.

On the north of the former town it now starts from a point beyond but the line of the cliff, near the Van road and extends along a natural ridge eastwards. From the castle’s southerly cliff the wall crosses the low saddle to the north-east. The two walls meet at the summit of the next hill, in order to keep control of all the land commanding the town. Beyond this hill’s summit stretches a seemingly empty expanse of low, spreading hills.

Until the 1850s. Khoshab fortress city had about 1.500 families 1.000 of which were Armenians. Until 1847, semi-independent Kurdish beys also lived there, but that same year, the Ottoman government, occupying the fortress, abolished their semi-independent rule.

Further reading
Castle Sevgen, AK.I.137-46; Goodwin 188. Hist.: Evliya, Üçdaş ed., IV.1297-8; Arakel of Tabriz, tr. Brosset, 502, 510-14.
Hovhannesean, Castles 304-6 (17th & 18th century); Jaubert, Voyage 362-3; Layard, Nineveh and Babylon 385, 386-7 (desc.).
Berkian, Thesis 159-61. Bridge. Çulpan, Taş Köprüler 175-6; Goodwin 188 & fıg. 181. (Thesis on munumentsmentioned SanTarYıl 3(1969–70), 270).
 Sinclair, T.A. (1987). Eastern Turkey: An Architectural and Archeological Survey. London: The Pindar Press. p. 212-215.

Gallery

References

Archaeological sites in Eastern Anatolia
Castles in Van Province
History of Van Province
1640s establishments in the Ottoman Empire
Kurdish historical sites